We™ are an illbient production and DJ collective that was formed in Williamsburg, Brooklyn in 1991 by DJ Olive aka Gregor Asch, Lloop aka Rich Panciera and Once 11 aka Nacho aka Ignacio Platas.  They have released music on Asphodel Records alongside DJ Spooky, Byzar and Sub Dub. They are now associated with the Agriculture Records label. We™ have remixed tracks for Arto Lindsay, Free Kitten, and Medeski, Martin, and Wood among others.

It is unknown whether or not We™ are still active.

As Is (1997)

The Square Root of Negative One (1999)

Decentertainment (2000)

References

Illbient